Marshfield is in Wood and Marathon counties in the state of Wisconsin. It is located at the intersection of U.S. Highway 10, Highway 13 and Highway 97. The largest city in Wood County, its population was 18,929 at the 2020 census. Of this, 18,119 were in Wood County, and 810 were in Marathon County. The city is part of the United States Census Bureau's Marshfield-Wisconsin Rapids Micropolitan Statistical Area, which includes all of Wood County (2020 population: 74,207). The portion of the city in Marathon County is part of the Wausau Metropolitan Statistical Area.

Marshfield is home to the Marshfield Clinic, a large healthcare system that serves much of Central, Northern, and Western Wisconsin. In 2010, Marshfield was ranked 5th in a list of "The Best Small Cities to Raise a Family" compiled by Forbes magazine.

History
In 1851 and 1853, when the area was still forested, surveyors working for the U.S. government marked all the section corners in the  square which now includes Marshfield, Hewitt, and Cameron, working on foot with compass and chain. When done, the deputy surveyor filed this general description:
This Township is nearly all Dry land, There being no Swamp of consequence in it. There being to much clay & rocks in it. Particularly that part which contains Fir & Hemlock. The surface is rough & uneven(?) and rather to flat for anything but meadow. There is some good Pine it but to much scattering to make it an object. The Township is well watered with small streams but none of them are of sufficient size for Milling purposes. The streams are lined with Alder & many of them producing good hay. There are no improvements in this Township.

Marshfield was settled much later than many surrounding towns. A sawmill was built at Nekoosa in 1832. A sawmill was built at Neillsville around 1847. The first building at Marshfield came in 1872.

In 1872 the Wisconsin Central Railway was building the leg of its line from Stevens Point through the forest to what would become Colby, heading north for Lake Superior. The railway needed a supply depot between those two towns, and Marshfield was about midway. At the railroad's request, Louis Rivers, his wife and child, and his brother Frank came to the area and started cutting an opening in the forest. They built a two-room log hotel at what is now the corner of Depot and Chestnut streets, with bunks in the west room and tables, benches, bar and store in the east room. That crude building between the stumps was the first permanent structure in Marshfield.

Marshfield's name is explained two ways. It might have been named for John J. Marsh, one of the original owners of land in the area. Marshfield might also have been named after Marshfield, Massachusetts, since the Wisconsin Central Railway was financed with money from Massachusetts and other stops along the WC's line were named after towns in Massachusetts, including Amherst, Medford and Chelsea.

The first industry was a stave and spoke factory located near the railroad. In 1878 William H. Upham, a "Yankee" migrant of English descent from Massachusetts and later governor of Wisconsin, built a sawmill near the railway, with a millpond. By 1885 he had added a general store, a planing mill, a furniture factory and a flour and feed mill. Other businesses started, too: an alcohol factory, hotels, saloons, stores, newspapers, blacksmith, and a milliner. There were also churches and schools. The city was incorporated in 1883.  By 1885 the population exceeded 2,000, ranging from the Uphams in their fine Italianate homes to laborers living in shacks along the railroad.

In 1887, a fire started and got out of control. On June 27, after a dry three weeks, fire broke out among the drying piles in the Upham mill's lumberyard, ignited by a spark from a train. The fire spread, consuming the sawmill and flour mill, and headed south into homes and the business district. Men tried to stop the inferno, even dynamiting stores to create a fire break, but the updraft lifted embers and dropped them onto more buildings. When it was over, 250 buildings were destroyed, but there were no deaths. The next day, Upham announced he would rebuild his businesses. Neighbors in Stevens Point, Spencer and Wisconsin Rapids sent trainloads of supplies. The city ruled that buildings on Central should henceforth be built from brick, even though Marshfield had been largely built on wealth generated by lumber.

The late 1800s saw a burst of railroad building. In 1872 the Wisconsin Central built the first line through town. In 1887 Upham Manufacturing started a line south from town to haul logs from Cameron and Richfield. In 1890 a line to Neillsville was built. In 1891 a line was built from Centralia (now Wisconsin Rapids), another was built to Greenwood, and a third from Wausau to Marshfield came from the north. In 1901 a second line was built from Wisconsin Rapids to Marshfield. In 1903 38 passenger trains stopped daily in Marshfield.  So many tracks intersected in the community that Marshfield was nicknamed "Hub City".

The hub was also agricultural.  Dairying began to organize as cheese factories started up, such as the one at Nasonville in 1885.  Roddis and then Blum Brothers made wooden cheese boxes in Marshfield. By 1921 the Blum plant was making 3,500 boxes a day. In 1907 the first cold storage plant was built in town, to store local cheese before shipping it by rail to larger markets.  Ice cream factories followed, and processing of eggs, chickens, and liquid milk. In 1923 a spokesman for the Soo Line Railroad said that Marshfield shipped more dairy products than any other city in the United States.

St. Joseph's hospital began with six beds in 1890. Operated by the Sisters of the Sorrowful Mother, it offered early health insurance.  Lumbermen could pay a flat rate, and in exchange St. Joseph's would care for them in case of injury. In 1916, six local doctors formed a group practice clinic in the second story of the Thiel building downtown, calling themselves Marshfield Clinic.

German immigrants made up two thirds of Marshfield's population in the 1890s. One of the two early newspapers, Die Demokrat, was published in German.  Many had family back in Germany as World War I approached, and had mixed sympathies.  In one of Marshfield's old Victorian houses, a once-hidden paper-hanger's signature boasts, "...1917, when the Germans licked the World." Feelings were again mixed during World War II.  In the summer of 1945, 243 German POWs were brought in to fill a labor shortage at the canning factory north of the current Wildwood Park.

Wood-working and building continued long after the pines were cut.  During World War II, Roddis Lumber and Veneer, which produced plywood and other composites, was "the Allies' largest pre-fabricator of wood for Liberty ships".  Felker Brothers also produced components for the Liberty ships.  The Frey brothers started building Rollohomes in 1947, and were followed by other manufacturers of mobile and modular homes.  With consolidation of dairy farms and the late-2000s recession, some of these industries have contracted, the medical complex has expanded. Roehl Transport has also become a large enterprise.  Around 2011 three new plants opened on the east side of town to process sand for hydraulic fracturing of oil and gas wells.

Geography

Marshfield is located at (44.6649, −90.1760), sitting on a low ridge called the Marshfield moraine by geologists.

Climate
The Köppen climate classification subtype for the climate of Marshfield is "Dfb". (Warm Summer Continental Climate).

Transportation

Major highways 
 U.S. Highway 10
 Highway 13 (Wisconsin)
 Highway 97 (Wisconsin)

Airport
KMFI – Marshfield Municipal Airport

Demographics

2020 census
As of the census of 2020, the population was 18,929. The racial makeup of the city was 90.5% White, 2.6% Asian, 1.1% Black or African American, 0.3% Native American, 0.1% Pacific Islander, 1.2% from other races, and 4.2% from two or more races. Ethnically, the population was 3.4% Hispanic or Latino of any race.

2010 census
As of the census of 2010, there were 19,118 people, 8,777 households, and 4,995 families residing in the city. The racial makeup of the city was 94.8% White, 0.7% African American, 0.2% Native American, 2.3% Asian, 0.8% from other races, and 1.2% from two or more races. Hispanic or Latino people of any race were 2.4% of the population.

There were 8,777 households, of which 25.6% had children under the age of 18 living with them, 43.4% were married couples living together, 9.9% had a female householder with no husband present, 3.7% had a male householder with no wife present, and 43.1% were non-families. 36.8% of all households were made up of individuals, and 14.4% had someone living alone who was 65 years of age or older. The average household size was 2.14 and the average family size was 2.78.

The median age in the city was 41.3 years. 20.9% of residents were under the age of 18; 8.5% were between the ages of 18 and 24; 24.8% were from 25 to 44; 27.4% were from 45 to 64; and 18.4% were 65 years of age or older. The gender makeup of the city was 47.3% male and 52.7% female.

2000 census
As of the census of 2000, there were 18,800 people, 8,235 households, and 4,866 families residing in the city. The population density was 1,477.9 people per square mile (570.7/km2). There were 8,617 housing units at an average density of 677.4 per square mile (261.6/km2). The racial makeup of the city was 97.12% White, 0.39% African American, 0.23% Native American, 1.38% Asian, 0.01% Pacific Islander, 0.22% from other races, and 0.64% from two or more races. Hispanic or Latino people of any race were 0.78% of the population.

There were 8,235 households, out of which 27.8% had children under the age of 18 living with them, 48.2% were married couples living together, 8.2% had a female householder with no husband present, and 40.9% were non-families. 35.2% of all households were made up of individuals, and 14.0% had someone living alone who was 65 years of age or older. The average household size was 2.24 and the average family size was 2.91.

In the city, the age distribution of the population shows 22.9% under the age of 18, 8.8% from 18 to 24, 28.3% from 25 to 44, 22.2% from 45 to 64, and 17.8% who were 65 years of age or older. The median age was 39 years. For every 100 females, there were 90.2 males. For every 100 females age 18 and over, there were 85.7 males.

The median income for a household in the city was $37,248, and the median income for a family was $50,498. Males had a median income of $31,848 versus $23,745 for females. The per capita income for the city was $21,965. About 3.7% of families and 6.6% of the population were below the poverty line, including 6.2% of those under age 18 and 10.0% of those age 65 or over.

Education

The Marshfield School District consists of Madison, Grant, Lincoln, Nasonville, and Washington elementary schools, Marshfield Middle School, and Marshfield High School.
Marshfield parochial schools include Trinity Lutheran School (K–8), Immanuel Lutheran School (Pre-K–8), and Columbus Catholic Schools. The latter is a Pre-K–12 system consisting of St. John the Baptist Primary School, Our Lady of Peace Intermediate School, Columbus Catholic Middle School, and Columbus Catholic High School.

The University of Wisconsin–Stevens Point at Marshfield and Mid-State Technical College – Marshfield Campus are located in Marshfield.

Culture
Marshfield has a local community arts facility, Chestnut Center for the Arts, and is the home of the New Visions Art Gallery, located in the Marshfield Clinic. The Vox Concert Series brings music performers from across the country to Marshfield. In addition, the local UW campus hosts artists in its art gallery.

Marshfield Public Library, located downtown, offers adult and children's programs.

Health care
The Marshfield Clinic system provides health care for much of northern Wisconsin. It operates residency programs in dermatology, internal medicine, pediatrics, internal medicine-pediatrics, dentistry, and surgery, as well as a transitional year of residency. In addition, fellowships are offered in internal medicine and palliative medicine. The Marshfield Clinic also hosts medical and physician assistant students for the University of Wisconsin School of Medicine and Public Health and provides medical education, clinical experiences, and rotations. Marshfield Clinic sponsors the Security Health Plan of Wisconsin.

Marshfield Medical Center (Marshfield, Wisconsin), the only hospital in Marshfield, serves as a tertiary care center for much of northern Wisconsin. It is part of the Marshfield Clinic Health System.

Points of interest
 Upham Mansion
 World's Largest Round Barn
 Columbia Park
 Wildwood Park and Zoo
 Jurustic Park
Wenzel Family Plaza
Vandehey Waters

Notable people

 Elliot Anderson, Nevada legislator
 Fred Beell, wrestler
 Robert Brokl, artist, printmaker and activist
 Todd Boss, poet
 John W. Byrnes, U.S. Congressman
 Jose Pablo Cantillo, stage and television actor
 Alden Carter, author
 William D. Connor, Lieutenant Governor of Wisconsin
 Marshall E. Cusic Jr., U.S. Navy admiral, Chief of the U.S. Navy Reserve Medical Corps
 Tom Domres, NFL player
 Peter Ebbe, Wisconsin State Assembly
 Ethan Finlay, soccer player; attended Marshfield High School
 Robert F. Froehlke, Secretary of the Army, Assistant secretary of Defense
 Bob Galvin, businessman
 Paul Galvin, co-founder of Motorola
 Donald W. Hasenohrl, Wisconsin State Assembly
 Raymond F. Heinzen, Wisconsin State Senator
 Chester A. Krohn, Wisconsin State Assembly
 Melvin R. Laird, Sr., Wisconsin State Senator and clergyman
 Melvin R. Laird, U.S. House of Representatives (1952–1969), Secretary of Defense (1969–1973)
 Henry A. Lathrop, Wisconsin State  Assembly
 MaryAnn Lippert, Wisconsin legislator
 Philleo Nash, Commissioner of the Bureau of Indian Affairs
 William Noll, Wisconsin State Assembly
 John Oestreicher, Wisconsin State Assembly
 Laurie Olin, Landscape architect; born in Marshfield
 Everett Roehl, founder of Roehl Transport, Inc.
 Andrew Rock, Olympic gold medalist
 Elwyn E. Royce, Wisconsin State Assembly
 Kelda Roys, Wisconsin State Senator
 Emil P. Scheibe, Wisconsin legislator and brewer
 Karl Schuelke, professional football player for the Pittsburgh Pirates
 Lauren Sesselmann, professional soccer player
 Rich Seubert, professional football player for the New York Giants
 John Stauber, author
 Theodore Steinmetz, composer/conductor
 Adam Stenavich, Offensive coordinator for the Green Bay Packers
 Mark Tauscher, professional football player for the Green Bay Packers, born in Marshfield
 William H. Upham, former governor of Wisconsin
 Gary Varsho, retired professional baseball player for the Chicago Cubs, Pittsburgh Pirates, Cincinnati Reds, and Philadelphia Phillies
 Lee Weigel, professional football player for the Green Bay Packers
 Charles Werner, Pulitzer Prize-winning cartoonist
 Eli Winch, Wisconsin legislator
 Elizabeth Zimmermann, British-born knitter known for her books and instructional series on American public television

Images

See also 
 National Register of Historic Places listings in Wood County, Wisconsin

References

External links

 City of Marshfield
 Sanborn fire insurance maps: 1884 1887 1891 1898 1904 1912
 Historic plat maps: 1909 city  1928 west side  1928 east side

Cities in Wisconsin
Populated places established in 1868
Cities in Wood County, Wisconsin
Cities in Marathon County, Wisconsin
Wisconsin Rapids-Marshfield